Andrzej Marian Grzyb (born 23 August 1956) is a Polish politician who served as a Member of the European Parliament from 2003 until 2004 and from 2009 until 2019. He was elected to Sejm on 25 September 2005, getting 7,986 votes in 36 Kalisz district as a candidate from the Polish People's Party list.

From 2014 until 2019, Grzyb was a member of the European Parliament's Democracy Support and Election Coordination Group (DEG), which oversees the Parliament's election observation missions.

He was also a member of People's Republic of Poland Sejm 1989-1991, Sejm 1993-1997, and Sejm 2001-2005.

See also
Members of Polish Sejm 2005-2007

References

External links
 

1956 births
Living people
Members of the Polish Sejm 1993–1997
Members of the Polish Sejm 2001–2005
Members of the Polish Sejm 2005–2007
Members of the Polish Sejm 2007–2011
Members of the Polish Sejm 2019–2023
Polish People's Party politicians
Polish People's Party MEPs
MEPs for Poland 2004
MEPs for Poland 2009–2014
MEPs for Poland 2014–2019
Knights of the Order of Polonia Restituta
Recipients of the Gold Cross of Merit (Poland)